Giusto Cerutti (9 March 1903 – 17 December 1993) was an Italian racing cyclist. He rode in the 1928 Tour de France.

References

1903 births
1993 deaths
Italian male cyclists
Place of birth missing